Thomas Staub (born 22 July 1955) is a retired Swiss football defender.

References

1955 births
Living people
Swiss men's footballers
FC Frauenfeld players
FC Zürich players
FC Aarau players
FC Winterthur players
Association football defenders
Swiss Super League players
Swiss football managers
FC St. Gallen managers
FC Frauenfeld managers